The painted terrapin, painted batagur, or saw-jawed turtle (Batagur borneoensis) is a species of turtles in the family Geoemydidae. It was formerly in its own genus, Callagur, but has been reclassified to the genus, Batagur.

Distribution
It is distributed in the rainforest of Brunei, Indonesia (Sumatra and Kalimantan), Malaysia, and Thailand.

Status
The painted terrapin is critically endangered species according to IUCN, listed in The World's Most 25 Endangered Freshwater Turtles and Tortoises 2011. It is listed in Appendix II, with a zero quota for commercial trade of wild-captured specimens according to the CITES meeting in Thailand, March 2013.

Batagur borneoensis is a priority species to be conserved in Indonesia according to Minister of Forestry Decree No. 57 Year 2008 about Strategic Direction of National Species Conservation 2008–18. In Malaysia, this species is protected by the World Wide Fund for Nature.

Threats
Harvesting by fishermen to eat, poaching to meet pet and food demand, habitat loss due to land conversion to palm oil, and fish and shrimp farming are major threats.

Conservation
Conservation efforts in Sumatra, Indonesia, are ongoing to increase wild populations by carrying out nesting patrols to secure and hatch the eggs, for later release into original habitats.

In Malaysia, the painted terrapin is protected through the WWF's hawksbill turtle and painted terrapin conservation project. The project aims establish the protection and effective management of critical nesting habitats of painted terrapins and their key habitats, through measures that are scientifically based and socially acceptable, and that can be sustained in the long term by government, the local community and other stakeholders.

References

External links
 Photos of  Callagur borneoensis at Empire of the Turtle
 Freshwater Turtles and Tortoises Initiative in Sumatra: photos, education, field research, captive breeding

Batagur
Reptiles of Indonesia
Reptiles described in 1844
Taxonomy articles created by Polbot